Jesse Van Saun (born 1976) is a retired American soccer player who played professionally in Major League Soccer and USISL.

Van Saun grew up in Hillsdale, New Jersey and graduated from Pascack Valley High School. He played soccer with the Brooklyn Italians youth team.  He attended St. John's University where he was part of the school's 1996 NCAA Men's Division I Soccer Championship team.  On February 1, 1998, the New England Revolution selected Van Saun in the second round (seventeenth overall) of the 1998 MLS College Draft.  He played five games for the Revolution and went on loan to the Worcester Wildfire of the USISL in April.  He struggled with injuries including an abdominal strain and hospitalization due to dehydration.  In August, he went on loan with the  Project 40 team.  When the Revolution signed Tony Kuhn in April 1999, they waived Van Saun to free up a roster spot.  Two days later the Chicago Fire claimed Van Saun off waivers.  On May 6, 1999, the Fire traded him to the Kansas City Wizards in exchange for Ryan Tinsley.  His problems with heat stroke continued with the Wizards.  In July 1999, he went on loan for two games with Project 40.  The Wizards waived him in November 1999.  In 2000, he played for the Long Island Rough Riders.  In 2002, he played for the New York Freedom.

References

External links
 

1976 births
Living people
American soccer players
American people of Dutch descent
Connecticut Wolves players
Sporting Kansas City players
Long Island Rough Riders players
Major League Soccer players
New England Revolution players
New York Freedom players
St. John's Red Storm men's soccer players
Worcester Wildfire players
A-League (1995–2004) players
MLS Pro-40 players
New England Revolution draft picks
Pascack Valley High School alumni
People from Hillsdale, New Jersey
Soccer players from New Jersey
Sportspeople from Bergen County, New Jersey
Association football defenders
NCAA Division I Men's Soccer Tournament Most Outstanding Player winners